Revolution of Our Times is a 2021 Hong Kong documentary film directed by Kiwi Chow. With interviews and footage of the frontline protest scenes, the film covers the stories of the 2019–2020 Hong Kong protests. The documentary takes its name from a locally well-known political slogan "liberate Hong Kong, revolution of our times" which has been ruled as illegal by the Hong Kong High Court. The film had its debut in the 2021 Cannes Film Festival in France and is currently banned in China and Hong Kong.

Synopsis
For many years, Hong Kongers have fought for freedoms and democracy but have yet succeeded. In 2019, a proposed extradition legislation ignited heated debates in Hong Kong and gave birth to wave after wave of protests. The documentary features seven groups of protestors and pieces their tales together into one big story to chronicle the protest movement.

Legality Issues
The documentary gets its name from the second half of a ubiquitous political slogan of "liberate Hong Kong, revolution of our times". In July 2021, three specially designated national security law judges of the Hong Kong High Court unanimously convicted a Hong Kong protestor, Tong Ying-kit, for endangering national security over carrying a flag emblazoned with the slogan.  The judges ruled that the display of the phrase was "capable of inciting others to commit secession" and thus violated the national security law implemented in Hong Kong by China. Per this ruling and the national security law, it is believed that the documentary is also illegal.

In addition, the national security law contains provisions for extraterritorial jurisdiction which means the law covers every person everywhere on earth, including foreign cinemagoers and film festival organisers for their actions outside Hong Kong. Legal scholars have warned that anyone who has done anything that might offend the Hong Kong government should stay out of Hong Kong. Quite a few countries have issued travel warnings about it, including Australia, Canada, Ireland, New Zealand, the UK, and the US.

Production
The documentary is officially said to be produced "by Hong Kongers" as the political situation and legal environment of Hong Kong compels strict secrecy and anonymity over the making of the film. The only individual who was involved in the production of the documentary but has since revealed their own identity is the director, Kiwi Chow. He has explained to the press that the revelation of his identify was his way to fight back against self-censorship.

Yet, other than Chow, all members of the film crew and production team have remained anonymous. Who funded the making of the film is also unknown, but Chow has mentioned that a businessperson invited him to make the documentary. Many individuals had also decided to quit midway during the two-year production of the documentary. Chow has also been deeply grateful to other filmmakers and photographers who had given him a lot of footage and materials to use, especially when one of them had decided to stop creating their own film projects out of fear that they could run into trouble with the controversial national security law newly imposed on Hong Kong by China.

The use of the iconic song "Glory to Hong Kong" at the end of the documentary film had engulfed in copyright controversies. DGX Music, composer of the song, accused Kiwi Chow of stealing the song and demanded Chow to remove the soundtrack. Chow apologised for the mistakes over handling of copyrights, but insisted the contract of copyright is still being drafted and is willing to increase the copyright fee. The deadlock was resolved after both sides issued joint statement on 6 April 2022, with DGX Music authorizing the soundtrack in the film for free and apologised for negative impacts caused.

Screenings, Releases & Reception
Because it has been judged that the action of displaying the phrase "liberate Hong Kong, revolution of our times" is an illegal activity, it is not possible to screen or show the documentary anywhere in its homeland. However, it has been able to screen the film outside Hong Kong as the copyrights, masters, and materials of the film have already been sold abroad. The documentary made its debut in 2021 Cannes Film Festival.

Australia 
Local Hong Kongese expat community organisations in Australia are organising special screenings in six major cities, including Adelaide, Brisbane, Canberra, Melbourne, Perth, and Sydney. These screenings are available from 1 April 2022 to 10 April 2022.

Canada 
The film had its first screening in Canada in February 2022 across several cities: Calgary, Edmonton, Toronto, Vancouver, and Victoria. The documentary has been very popular, and tickets quickly sold out. The film was originally intended to be screened in February only, but the organisers are planning to have extra screenings in March.

France: Cannes Film Festival
The 2021 Cannes Film Festival saw the world premiere of the film, but the existence of the film was not known to the public until the day before the awards ceremony. The documentary had long been accepted into the film festival, but it was kept as a secret. The organisers explained that they had done so because the film had not been completed until the very last moment. Yet, it was reported that the film festival organisers had actually been concerned that the potential backlash from Chinese authorities would have caused Chinese filmmakers of other films to withdraw from the festival if the news of the inclusion of the documentary had been made public in advance. In any case, the festival only held a confidential screening of the film to a small group of journalists and waited until the day before the ceremony to make a statement about the film.

Japan: Tokyo Filmex
Similar to Cannes, the Tokyo Filmex did not make known to the public in advance there would be any screening of the film in case of Chinese sabotage. The documentary got a surprise screening on the last day of the film festival. Even though the announcement of the special showing of the documentary did not get made until the day before, it was reported that the whole venue of 700 seats was full.

Taiwan
In Taiwan, the documentary was first intended to only premiere for four days during the 2021 Taipei Golden Horse Film Festival, but tickets got sold out within one hour of sale. Two extra screenings were then added, but tickets were snapped up at a much faster pace and gone within five minutes. The documentary saw its first public release in the world in Taiwan on 25 February 2022.

Yet, the night before the public release in Taiwan, the documentary’s official YouTube channel and all its trailers were taken down after having received tremendous complaints. And a few hours later, everything returned to normal upon the successful appeal lodged by the film’s team in Taiwan.

Local Taiwanese media also reported that any Facebook post containing the documentary’s title would result in unusually low reach rates. Moreover, it was reported that the film’s marketing team had been blocked by Facebook’s system and unable to place ads on the platform even after filing a complaint to the social media.

Overall, the film was very well-received in Taiwan. It broke a box office record in the island as an overseas documentary in the first week.

Support from Local Governments & Politicians
Notably, the documentary has won widespread support from the political class in Taiwan. Some local governments, like Kaohsiung City and Keelung City, even sponsored and hosted special screenings for free for students. The Taipei Economic and Cultural Representative Office in the United States also hosted a screening in Washington, DC.

Many politicians have also come out in support of the public release of the film and even publicly promoted and recommended it to the general public. Taiwanese President Tsai Ing-wen recommended the film to the public through her social media accounts on multiple occasions. In a Tweet written entirely in English, she shared the poster of the documentary and praised, "The Hong Kong people’s courage & commitment to democracy are an inspiration to us all, as we work to preserve our own freedoms & way of life." She also hosted a special screening session on her own for her advisors and supporters.

Taiwanese politicians publicly endorsing the documentary:
 Tsai Ing-wen, President of the Republic of China
 Lai Ching-te, Vice President of the Republic of China
 Su Tseng-chang, Premier of the Republic of China
 You Si-kun, Speaker of parliament
 Lee Yung-te, Minister of Culture
 Lin Chia-lung, Ambassador-at-large
 Lin Yu-chang, Mayor of Keelung City
 Huang Wei-che, Mayor of Tainan
 Lin Chih-chien, Mayor of Hsinchu City
 Cheng Wen-tsan, Mayor of Taoyuan City
 Chen Chi-mai, Mayor of Kaohsiung
 Lin Fei-fan, Deputy Secretary-General of Democratic Progressive Party
 Enoch Wu, Chairman of the Taipei Chapter of Democratic Progressive Party
 More than a dozen of MPs

United Kingdom

Hong Kong Film Festival in UK
Revolution of Our Times was first shown in Britain as the opening gala for the very first Hong Kong Film Festival in the UK. When the tickets first went on sale online, the traffic was too much, and the website broke down immediately.

As part of the film festival, the documentary was screened in Bristol, Edinburgh, Manchester, and London. It was reported that long queues were formed outside the cinema an hour before the first British screening started on 19 March 2022. Kiwi Chow also hosted a virtual question-and-answer session after the opening gala.

Public Release
On 26 March 2022, it was announced that the documentary would be publicly released through various commercial cinema chains across the UK. The film’s team also revealed that they had not been able to do so even after many attempts prior. However, as a large number of community organisations and expat Hong Kongers in the country joined the worldwide special release project and contacted various cinema chains to arrange private screenings, some of the cinema chains reserved course and proactively got in touch with the film team to organise the public release.

The documentary has been publicly released via commercial cinema chains in the UK since 6 April 2022.

United States
The start of the premiere week in the US coincided with 2021 Human Rights Day. The film was available at selected cinemas in seven cities: Boston, Chicago, Los Angeles, New York, San Francisco, Seattle, and Washington DC.

Worldwide Special Release Project

On 4 March 2022, it was announced that the distributor was planning to have a special release across the globe and extend an invitation to the world, especially Hong Kongers in exile, to come together and take part in the project. The special release would allow participating individuals and civil society organisations to host special screenings for 10 days continuously, starting from 1 April 2022. Each screening would have to have a minimum of 50 seats, but there would be no restriction on the maximum number of screenings a participant could host. 
 
On the first day of the worldwide release, it was announced that near 130 screenings would be hosted throughout the world during the period.

Available Countries during Special Worldwide Release:

 Australia
 Austria
 Belgium
 Czech Republic
 Denmark
 Estonia
 Finland
 France
 Germany
 Ireland
 Lithuania
 Malaysia
 Netherlands
 New Zealand
 Norway
 Philippines
 Poland
 Portugal
 Sweden
 Switzerland
 Taiwan
 Thailand
 United Kingdom
 United States

Accolades

References

External links
 Official Trailer (YouTube)
 

2021 documentary films
2021 films
Hong Kong documentary films
2020s Cantonese-language films
Documentary films about human rights
2019–2020 Hong Kong protests